Raml Souk is a town and commune in El Taref Province, Algeria. According to the 1998 census it has a population of 3,715.

References

Communes of El Taref Province
Cities in Algeria